"Maiden Voyage" is a jazz composition by Herbie Hancock from his 1965 album Maiden Voyage. It features Hancock's quartet – trumpeter Freddie Hubbard, bassist Ron Carter and drummer Tony Williams – with additional saxophonist George Coleman. It is one of Hancock's best-known compositions and has become a jazz standard.

The piece was used in a Fabergé commercial and was originally listed on the album's master tape as "TV Jingle" until Hancock's sister came up with the new name. In the liner notes for the Maiden Voyage album, Hancock states that the composition was an attempt to capture "the splendor of a sea-going vessel on its maiden voyage".

While being interviewed for KCET TV in 2011, Hancock considered Maiden Voyage to be his favorite of all of the compositions he had written.

Harmonic Structure 

A modal jazz piece, the composition follows a 32-bar AABA form with only two chords in each section:

 A7/D   |   |   |   |   C7/F    |   |   |
 A7/D   |   |   |   |   C7/F    |   |   |
 Bb7/Eb |   |   |   |   Ab7/Db  |   |   |
 A7/D   |   |   |   |   C7/F    |   |   |   

There are several different perspectives on exactly how to label or interpret  these harmonies. The chord voicings used by Hancock make extensive use of perfect fourths, and could be interpreted as quartal harmonies: for example, the opening chord Am7/D has the notes A, C, E, G, D, and the same notes in a different order spell out a series of perfect fourths creating a quartal chord, E, A, D, G, C.

Another common analysis in print is to label each chord a suspended chord. In this perspective, the first chord Am7/D (D, A, C, E, G) can be thought of as a Dm9 chord (D, F, A, C, E) with a suspended 4th (G instead of F). Along these lines, Jazz.com's Ted Gioia describes the harmonic progression used as "four suspended chords,"  Jerry Coker describes the progression as "only sus. 4 chords," From this perspective, the first chord is really an extended Dm chord with a suspension. 

On the other hand, The Real Book lists the chords as four minor seventh chords with the bass note a fifth below the root which matches Hancock's description of the opening chord (right). This label implies that the opening chord is not really any kind of Dm chord, but an Am7 chord with a non-chord-tone D in the bass. The Real Book also spells the fourth chord (measures 22-24) as A-7/D, while Owens spells it Cm13. These two ways of spelling the fourth chord are actually enharmonic equivalents; The pitches of Cm13 (ninth chord)  are just a different way of spelling the same notes as A-7/D (C = D, E=F, etc.)

Recorded Versions 
Herbie Hancock, on his album Maiden Voyage
Bobby Hutcherson, on his album Happenings
Ramsey Lewis, on his album Maiden Voyage
Grant Green, on the album Alive!
Brian Auger and the Trinity, on the 1970 album Befour
Jazz rock band Blood, Sweat, and Tears, on their 1972 album New Blood
The rock band Phish performed the song in their early concerts. A live version was released on their album Colorado '88.
Toto, on their 2002 album Through the Looking Glass. This recording included elements of Hancock's 1974 song "Butterfly".
Robert Glasper, on his 2004 album Mood. He recorded it again on his 2007 album In My Element, this time as a medley with Radiohead's "Everything in Its Right Place".

Notes 

1965 compositions
Jazz compositions
1960s jazz standards
Modal jazz standards
Jazz compositions in A minor
Songs written by Herbie Hancock